Sirleaf may refer to:
Ellen Johnson Sirleaf (born 1938), former President of Liberia, from 2006 to 2018
Fombah Sirleaf, her stepson and sometime director of the Liberian National Security Agency
Retta Sirleaf (born 1970), American stand-up comedian and actress
Momolu Sirleaf, Liberian foreign minister